Shapsha is a rural locality (a selo) and the administrative center of Shapshinskoye Rural Settlement, Kharovsky District, Vologda Oblast, Russia. The population was 493 as of 2002. There are 12 streets.

Geography 
Shapsha is located 33 km northwest of Kharovsk (the district's administrative centre) by road. Pankovskaya is the nearest rural locality.

References 

Rural localities in Kharovsky District